Malaysia made its Paralympic Games début at the 1972 Summer Paralympics in Heidelberg, with a delegation of three athletes, all of whom competed in both track and field and weightlifting. The country was then absent for three consecutive editions of the Summer Paralympics, before making its return at the 1988 Games in Seoul. Malaysia has participated in every subsequent edition of the Summer Paralympics, but has never entered the Winter Paralympics.

Malaysians have won a total of 16 medals at the Paralympic Games: six gold, four silver and six bronze. Six of these medals have been obtained in weightlifting or its successor sport, powerlifting. Powerlifter Siow Lee Chan, in 2008, was both Malaysia's first female Paralympic medallist, and the first Malaysian in sixteen years to have won a Paralympic medal. In 2016, Malaysia won its first ever gold medal in athletics.

Medal tables

Summer Paralympic Games

Medals by Summer Games

Medals by Summer Sports

List of medalists

Medals by individual
According to official data of the International Paralympic Committee. This is a list of people who have won two or more Paralympic medals for Malaysia. 

People in bold are still active competitors

See also
 Malaysia at the Olympics
 Malaysia at the Deaflympics

References